The 1978 Copa del Rey Final was the 76th final of the King's Cup. The final was played at Santiago Bernabéu Stadium in Madrid, on 19 April 1978, being won by FC Barcelona, who beat Las Palmas 3–1.

Details

References

1978
Copa
FC Barcelona matches
UD Las Palmas matches